Ernest Harper (3 August 1902 – 9 October 1979) was an English athlete who competed for Great Britain in the 1924, 1928 and 1936 Summer Olympics.

In 1924 he finished fifth in the 10000 metre and fourth in the individual cross country event. He was the only British finisher in this race; therefore, the British team was unplaced in the team cross country competition. Just fifteen of the thirty-eight starters finished the event due to the extreme heat, The Times reporting the scenes at the end of the race:

Some way behind Harper a figure in the scarlet drawers of Spain appeared in the entrance, turned the wrong way, was stopped, and then ran horribly round in little circles till he plunged on his face. Immediately another figure appeared, Sewell of the British team. He also tried to run the wrong way, was checked, and turned round, ran giddily a few yards, staggered, met another competitor, a Finn, also reeling, and the two fell together in a dreadful heap. Meanwhile a Frenchman had entered and ran three-quarters of the distance to the winning line, began to zig-zag, threw up his arms helplessly, and crashed full length on the ground. It was all heartbreaking to watch. Never, surely, in any race – not even in a Grand National – was there anything like the proportion of casualties; and the race ought never to have been run in the heat of such a day. It was altogether a terrible race. Harper’s performance was a fine one.

In 1928 Harper finished 22nd in the Olympic marathon; he improved to second place at the 1936 Berlin Olympics. Harper earned praise for advising eventual winner Sohn Kee-chung not to chase after Juan Carlos Zabala, who had opened a big lead. Zabala eventually pulled out of the race. Sohn was later reported to have said: "Please say Mr Harper is a very fine man for telling me about Zabala."

At the 1930 Empire Games Harper won the silver medal in the six miles event.

Harper ran for Hallamshire Harriers and Athletic Club in Sheffield. His record in the national cross-country championships was:
1923 – 3rd
1924 – 2nd
1925 – 2nd
1926 – 2nd
1927 – 1st
1928 – 14th
1929 – 1st
1930 – 2nd

In addition he won numerous Yorkshire and Northern cross-country titles and represented England in International Cross Country Championships in 1923–1931, winning the individual competition in 1926.

Harper had a fine reputation for sportsmanship. As well as the 1936 marathon incident mentioned above, in a 1924 international cross-country race he waited for another competitor, as described in The Times:

[The collapse of Ryan], besides causing much excitement, left Harper with every prospect of coming in first. Instead of making the most of his opportunity, however, Harper turned and waved for Cotterell to come along. Cotterell came up with a bound, and the pair ran abreast until about twenty-five yards from the tape, when Cotterell made a great sprint, leaving Harper apparently standing still, and won a sensational race. Cotterell must have put in some wonderful running in the last two-and-a-half miles to make up the ground he did. Without in the least trying to discount the excellence of his victory, however, every credit must be given to Harper, a young runner who, to say the least of it, displayed great unselfishness. There is no means of knowing exactly how much [Cotterell] had in reserve at the finish, but it certainly seemed that Harper deliberately sacrificed his chance of being the first man home.

Apocryphal stories tell of him helping up competitors who had fallen, and re-directing someone who had taken a wrong turn on a cross-country course. More prosaically, he was once said to have vacated his seat on a full bus to allow another passenger to sit, instead running behind the vehicle all the way up the steep hill to his home.

In 1939 Harper turned professional. Around that time he lived with his married daughter, who settled in Australia.

References

External links 
 
 

1902 births
1979 deaths
Sportspeople from Chesterfield, Derbyshire
English male marathon runners
Olympic athletes of Great Britain
Olympic silver medallists for Great Britain
Athletes (track and field) at the 1924 Summer Olympics
Athletes (track and field) at the 1928 Summer Olympics
Athletes (track and field) at the 1936 Summer Olympics
Commonwealth Games silver medallists for England
Commonwealth Games medallists in athletics
Athletes (track and field) at the 1930 British Empire Games
International Cross Country Championships winners
Medalists at the 1936 Summer Olympics
Olympic silver medalists in athletics (track and field)
Olympic cross country runners
Medallists at the 1930 British Empire Games